The 1957 Ice Hockey World Championships were held between 24 February and 5 March 1957 at the Palace of Sports of the Central Lenin Stadium in Moscow, USSR.

This was the last World Championships played on natural ice; and were the first World Championships held in the Soviet Union and they are remembered for the political circumstances surrounding the games. Hungary had been recently occupied by the Soviet Army (to suppress a revolution in October and November 1956), and as a result, the United States and Canada boycotted the World Championships in protest. Joining them were Norway, West Germany, Italy and Switzerland. East Germany participated at the top level for the first time.

Competition

With the boycott, the home team USSR was heavily favoured to win the tournament, but Sweden surprised the world by pulling off an upset. The first step was taken in their third game, when they beat Czechoslovakia 2-0. This important victory was saved by the head of Leksands IF defenseman Vilgot Larsson. He literally headed the puck away from the Swedish net to save a goal, and in the days before mandatory helmets, received several stitches for his heroics. In the final game, Sweden opened with two goals, but the dynamic Soviets responded with 4 goals of their own. Down by two in the third period, goals by Eilert Määttä and Erling Lindström tied the game, and the goaltending of Thord Flodqvist and play of Sven "Tumba" Johansson guaranteed the final draw. The USSR had previously only tied Czechoslovakia, so all Sweden needed was one point, or a tie, for gold.

Karel Straka of Czechoslovakia was named best goaltender. Nikolaï Sologubov of the USSR was best defenceman, and Sven "Tumba" Johansson of Sweden was best forward. Konstantin Loktev of the USSR led all scorers with 18 points (on 11 goals and 7 assists), followed by Nils Nilsson and Ronald Pettersson of Sweden, both with 16 points. Vsevolod Bobrov of the USSR led all scorers with 13 goals. Japan competed for the first time since 1930, and finished last with one point in the standings.

The Soviets did not have the Swedish national anthem ready for the gold medal ceremony. To compensate for this, the Swedish players decided to sing the anthem over the stadium's PA system. However, few players knew the anthem by heart so they decided to play a little prank on the Soviets and instead sang the Swedish drinking song "Helan Går". Swedish captain Lasse Björn later recalled the story of Marshal Zhukov, the Minister of Defence of the Soviet Union, standing to attention for a simple Swedish drinking song.

Standings

Final round

Attendance record
The final game (USSR versus Sweden for the championship) was played on the football field of the Grand Sports Arena of the Luzhniki Stadium. It is reputed that over 50,000 fans (or 55,000, depending on sources) saw the game, the most ever for an international hockey game. This stood as the world record until 6 October 2001, when 74,544 fans saw Michigan State University and the University of Michigan play an American NCAA Hockey game outdoors at Spartan Stadium in East Lansing, Michigan.

European Championship medal table
Games played against Japan did not count for the purposes of determining the European champion. Since six of the seven European participants defeated Japan, and since the only opponent that did not defeat Japan (Austria) also lost to each of their European opponents, finishing order for the European championship table was the same as it was for the main championship table.

Tournament awards
 Best players selected by the directorate:
 Best Goaltender:  Karel Straka
Best Defenceman:  Nikolaï Sologubov
Best Forward:  Sven Tumba

Citations

References
Complete results

1957
IIHF Men's World Ice Hockey Championships
World Championships
World Ice Hockey Championships
Ice Hockey World Championships
Ice Hockey World Championships
1956–57 in Soviet ice hockey
Sports competitions in Moscow
Ice Hockey World Championships